The People's Democratic Party was a political party in Trinidad and Tobago formed in 1953.  Under the leadership of Bhadase Sagan Maraj it contested the 1956 General Elections, capturing 5 of 24 elected seats in the Legislative Council and 20.3% of the vote.  In 1957 it joined the Federal Democratic Labour Party and later co-founded the Trinidad and Tobago Democratic Labour Party, together with the Trinidad Labour Party and the Party of Political Progress Groups.

References

Defunct political parties in Trinidad and Tobago